Wayne Township is one of the sixteen townships of Wayne County, Ohio, United States.  The 2000 census found 4,034 people in the township.

Geography
Located in the central part of the county, it borders the following townships:
Canaan Township - north
Milton Township - northeast corner
Green Township - east
East Union Township - southeast corner
Wooster Township - south
Plain Township - southwest corner
Chester Township - west
Congress Township - northwest corner

The city of Wooster, the county seat of Wayne County, occupies much of southern Wayne Township.

Name and history
It is one of twenty Wayne Townships statewide.

Government
The township is governed by a three-member board of trustees, who are elected in November of odd-numbered years to a four-year term beginning on the following January 1. Two are elected in the year after the presidential election and one is elected in the year before it. There is also an elected township fiscal officer, who serves a four-year term beginning on April 1 of the year after the election, which is held in November of the year before the presidential election. Vacancies in the fiscal officership or on the board of trustees are filled by the remaining trustees.

References

External links
Wayne County township map
County website

Townships in Wayne County, Ohio
Townships in Ohio